Patton v. United States may refer to:

United States Supreme Court decisions
Patton v. United States, 
Patton v. United States,